Ranchi Rajdhani Express is a premier train in the exclusive fleet of Rajdhani Express of Indian Railways. Currently there are two set of Rajdhani Express which connects capital of India, New Delhi with Ranchi, the capital of Jharkhand.

History
 The first set of Ranchi Rajdhani Express was inaugurated on 17 October 2001, which runs through  and terminated at Hatia instead of present terminal, Ranchi with one of the stoppages at Ranchi , flagged off by Nitish Kumar (former Minister of Railways) which used to run as a weekly service. Later, in 2004 the frequency of first set was increased to bi-weekly.
 Later, the second set of Ranchi Rajdhani Express was inaugurated on 11 June 2006, which runs through , Flagged off by Lalu Prasad Yadav (former Minister of Railways) which used to run as a bi-weekly service. (Mughalsarai Junction) like the previous route.  .

Routes
The three sets of Ranchi Rajdhani Express runs at two different routes:

 1st set of train number 20839/20840 runs through  with the length of 1305 km (1309 km towards Ranchi) with an average speed of 78 km/hr
Ranchi, Bokaro Steel City,  (Pt.Deen Dayal Upadhyaya Jn.),  to New Delhi.

 2nd set of train number 20407/20408 runs through Ranchi,  (no halt),  (Pt.Deen Dayal Upadhyaya Jn.),  to New Delhi and the route length is 1249 km.

 3rd set of train number 12453/12454 runs through Ranchi,  (no halt),  ( Renukoot ),  to New Delhi and the route length is 1246 km.

Traction 
The two sets of Ranchi Rajdhani Express is hauled by a WAP-7 (HOG)-equipped locomotive of Ghaziabad electric loco shed in both directions.

Incident
On 7 Sep 2017, the engine and power car of train derailed near New Delhi, but no casualties reported.

References

Transport in Delhi
Rajdhani Express trains
Rail transport in Jharkhand
Transport in Ranchi
Rail transport in Bihar
Rail transport in Uttar Pradesh
Rail transport in Delhi
Railway services introduced in 2001